A sales contest is a motivational program in which rewards are offered to sales people based upon their sales and/or results.  There are three types:

  Direct competition — the sales people compete against each other and there is one winner
  Team competition — there are teams which are rewarded collectively for winning. 
  Goal — rewards are given for achieving goals which may be won by more than one person

References

Sales